Revbensstäderna (lit. The Rib Cities) is a 2002 poetry collection by Swedish poet Eva Ström. It won the Nordic Council's Literature Prize in 2003.

References

2002 poetry books
Swedish poetry collections
Nordic Council's Literature Prize-winning works
Albert Bonniers Förlag books